Nguyễn Văn Trỗi (1 February 1940 – 15 October 1964) was a Vietnamese revolutionary and member of the Việt Cộng (National Liberation Front). He gained notoriety after being captured by South Vietnamese forces while trying to assassinate United States Secretary of Defense Robert McNamara and Ambassador Henry Cabot Lodge Jr. who were visiting South Vietnam in May 1964.

Sentence and execution
In May 1964 Viet Cong forces planned to assassinate McNamara and Lodge by blowing up the Cong Ly Bridge as their motorcade passed over the bridge. Trỗi was captured by South Vietnamese forces.

Sentenced to death, Trỗi got a brief reprieve after the FALN, a Venezuelan communist guerrilla group, kidnapped United States Air Force Lieutenant Colonel Michael Smolen in revenge for Trỗi's sentence. The group threatened to kill Smolen if Trỗi was executed. Smolen was eventually released unharmed, and Trỗi was shot by firing squad shortly thereafter in Chí Hòa Prison.

Trỗi became the first publicly executed member of the Viet Cong. His execution was filmed, and he remained defiant to the end. His last words before his execution in Saigon to correspondents were You are journalists and so you must be well informed about what is happening. It is the Americans who have committed aggression on our country, it is they who have been killing our people with planes and bombs ... I have never acted against the will of my people. It is against the Americans that I have taken action.When a priest offered him absolution, he refused, saying: "I have committed no sin. It is the Americans who have sinned." As the first shots were fired, he called out, "Long live Vietnam!"

Legacy

In the West, Trỗi's arrest went largely unreported in the mainstream; indeed, major news media did not report on Trỗi at all until the FALN kidnapping episode. His anonymity persisted after his execution, despite the honors heaped upon him in Communist countries. Apart from advocacy by revolutionaries like the Weather Underground, and a brief mention in Abbie Hoffman's Steal This Book (1971) as a "Vietnamese hero", Trỗi is still rarely acknowledged in Western accounts of the Vietnam War.

Trỗi was glorified by the Việt Cộng and North Vietnam as a martyr. The first notable act of recognition was in 1965 when the DRVN issued a postage stamp, illustrated on the right, bearing a portrait of him. Considered an exemplar, Trỗi has his name bestowed upon a large school, the Lycée Nguyễn Văn Trỗi in Nha Trang, and a national academic award, The Nguyễn Văn Trỗi Prize.

 Many cities in Vietnam have named major streets after him. In Hồ Chí Minh City, the major road upon which McNamara traveled—and where Trỗi planned to assassinate him—is named Nguyen Van Troi Boulevard and a memorial park, the Bia tưởng niệm Anh Hung Liet Si Nguyễn Văn Trỗi is located near the former Cong Ly Bridge. In Đà Nẵng, the Nguyễn Văn Trỗi Bridge spans the Hàn River. Other countries have commemorated Trỗi, particularly Cuba. where a 14,000-seat public stadium in Guantánamo is named Nguyen Van Troi Stadium, and his statue overlooks Nguyen Van Troi Park in Havana; the city also has a school and a hospital named for him.

Anti-war activists Jane Fonda and Tom Hayden named their son, an actor now known as Troy Garity, in honor of Trỗi.

The 1975 film Chronicle of a Latin American subversive (Spanish: Crónica de un subversivo latinoamericano) by director Mauricio Walerstein, narrates the kidnapping episode of Colonel Smolen (portrayed as Colonel Robert Whitney by actor Claudio Brook) by FALN guerrillas in response to Trỗi's death sentence.

Biography
Trỗi's widow, Phan Thi Quyen, authored the 1965 book Nguyễn Văn Trỗi As He Was.

References

1940 births
1964 deaths
Failed assassins
Vietnamese people of the Vietnam War
Executed Vietnamese people
People executed by South Vietnam
People executed by Vietnam by firing squad
1964 in Vietnam
People executed for attempted murder
Filmed executions
Vietnamese communists
Place of birth missing
Year of birth uncertain